Amy Odell is a British indie folk songwriter, artist and poet. Her approach to music has been described as organic, emotive atmospheric delivering hypnotic vocals. Her genre is an intertwining of 60s folk, indie, with threads of country and rich lyrical content. Her work explores politics, spirituality, solitude and relationships. A few of her past collaborative projects include Black Sky Down EP, guest vocal appearance on Gavin Friday album Catholic as well as a film score. Her first EP was released in 2014 and her album, Sirens, was released in 2016. Her debut vinyl 7' single, "Put That Gun Down" was released in 2018.

Odell also collaborated with the record producer Ken Thomas who produced and remixed two of her original tracks "Black Crow" and "I Am The Queen".

Music career

Friends and Crocodiles (2006)
Singer/co-writer for track used for TV production Friends and Crocodiles for Stephen Poliakoff

Capturing Mary (2007)
Singer/co-writer for the song used for the TV drama Capturing Mary for Stephen Poliakoff

Time Travel Boyfriends (2009)
Composer for the film Time Travel Boyfriends original film score, creating seven original pieces of music for the film

The Smoke (2014)
Singer/co-writer for the song "Love" which was used as soundtrack for film The Smoke

Discography
 Black Sky Down – EP – Roebeck & Amy Odell (2010)
   New York Chill Out album (2010)- "Black Sky Down" -Roebeck & Amy Odell 
 Death in Venice – EP (2014)
 " Sound of a King" – Single (2014)
  "Black Crow" – Remix (2016)
 Time Travel Boyfriends – (Original soundtrack) 2016
 Sirens – Album (2016)
 " Put That Gun Down" – Single (2016)
  "I Am The Queen" – Remix (2017)
 " Put That Gun Down" – Vinyl single (2018)
 " Something" – Single (2019)
 " Close my eyes" -single -Featuring The flaming Mustards (2021)
 " OM -single track- Featuring the Flaming Mustards (2021)
 " I sent you away Single track ,B side "Sun kissed" featuring The Flaming Mustards (2021 )
 " Run beside me -single track featuring The Flaming Mustards (2022)
 " Broken hearts - single (2022)
 " Ride - single (2022)

References

External links
 

Year of birth missing (living people)
Place of birth missing (living people)
Living people
British women singer-songwriters
British folk singers